Ennemis intérieurs (English: Enemies Within) is a French drama short film directed and written by Sélim Azzazi. It received critical appraisal and was nominated for many industry awards including Academy Award for Best Live Action Short Film at the 89th Academy Awards in 2017.

Synopsis
An interview at a local police station turns into an inquisition during which a French-Algerian born man sees himself accused of protecting the identities of possible terrorists. This close-up on France's troubled history with its former colonies has one man controlling the fate of another with the stroke of a pen during a turbulent period in the 1990s.

Cast
 Hassam Ghancy as Le demandeur
 Najib Oudghiri as L'interrogateur
 Stéphane Perrichon as Le gardien de la paix
 Nasser Azazi as Le père
 Amine Brossier as Le fils
 Farès Azazi as Jeune homme arrêté

Awards

References

External links
 
 

2016 films
2010s French-language films
Films set in France
Films set in 1996
2016 drama films
2016 short films
French drama short films
Films shot in Lyon
2010s French films